Sri Lanka  has its own indigenous scheme of traditional medicine which is called "Hela wedakama" (apart from Ayurveda). This system has been practised for thousands of years in the island nation. On the other hand, the Sri Lankan āyurvedic tradition is a mixture of the Sinhala traditional medicine, mainland āyurveda and Siddha systems of India, Unani  medicine of Greece through the Arabs, and most importantly, the Desheeya Chikitsa, which is the indigenous medicine of Sri Lanka. College teaching of these systems began in 1929 at what is now the Institute of Indigenous Medicine of the University of Colombo. The Siddha Medicine Unit moved in 1984 to the University of Jaffna

History
Sri Lanka developed its own Ayurvedic system based on a series of prescriptions handed down from generation to generation over a period of 3,000 years. The ancient kings, who were also prominent physicians, sustained its survival and longevity. King Buddhadasa (398 AD), the most influential of these physicians, wrote the obtain the permit prior to start treatments for the patients or prior to starting making medicines according to the ancient traditions.

Ancient inscriptions on rock surfaces reveal that organized medical services have existed within the country for centuries. In fact, Sri Lanka claims to be the first country in the world to have established dedicated hospitals with the capability of performing surgeries even for the animals. The Sri Lankan mountain Mihintale still has the ruins of what many believe to be the first hospital in the world. Old hospital sites now attract tourists. These places have come to symbolize a traditional sense of healing and care, which was so prevalent at that time.

Āyurvedic physicians had historically benefited from royal patronage which in turn endowed them with prestige in the island's social hierarchy. From this legacy stems a well-known Sri Lankan saying: "If you can not be a king, become a healer." Traditional medicine had largely died out in Sri Lanka with the advent and ravages of European colonialism and the growth in popularity of prescription drugs. In recent years, however, increasing numbers of tourists have been seeking out alternative remedies to persistent chronic ailments in traditional Sri Lankan medicine, among other things. In addition, along with Buddhism and other things made objects of nationalism, āyurveda continues to influence democratic politics and general political discourse in present-day Sri Lanka.

References

Ayurveda in Sri Lanka
South Asian traditional medicine